Boris Becker was the defending champion, but did not take part that year.Ivan Lendl won the title, defeating Tim Mayotte 6–3, 6–2, in the final.

Seeds

Draw

Finals

Top half

Bottom half

References
General

1990 Stella Artois Indoor